"Chalk One Up" is the fourth episode of the eighth season of the American television drama series Homeland, and the 88th episode overall. It premiered on Showtime on March 1, 2020.

Plot 
Carrie (Claire Danes) is escorted to Bagram Airfield where she is welcomed by Saul (Mandy Patinkin), and then President Warner (Beau Bridges).  Warner thanks Carrie for her sacrifice in Moscow, and informs her that he is taking her advice and visiting a military base in Afghanistan where, along with Afghan President Daoud (Christopher Maleki), he will announce the end of the war.   Warner and Daoud depart on helicopter "Chalk Two" accompanied by escort helicopter "Chalk One".

Carrie gets a frantic call from Samira (Sitara Attaie) asking for help—Samira's brother-in-law Bilal (Omar Farahmand) is attempting to kidnap her and force her into marriage.  Carrie and her team disable Bilal's car and hold the Taliban men at gunpoint when they try to leave, extricating Samira from the situation.

While returning from the military base, Chalk Two disappears from radar.  Chalk One surveys the area and sees the wreckage of a downed helicopter.  While looking for a place to land nearby, Chalk One spots Taliban soldiers on the ground.  Fire is exchanged briefly before Chalk One is shot down by an RPG blast.

Production 
The episode was directed by Seith Mann and co-written by executive producers Patrick Harbinson and Chip Johannessen.

Reception

Reviews 
The episode received an approval rating of 100% on the review aggregator Rotten Tomatoes based on five reviews.

New York Magazine's Brian Tallerico rated the episode 4 out of 5 stars, and called attention to "the way it balances the “macro” of President Warner’s journey to announce the ceasefire with the “micro” story of Samira Noori needing to be rescued by Carrie Mathison".

Scott Von Doviak of The A.V. Club gave the episode a "B+" grade, while writing "our certainty that something terrible is going to happen to President Warner at some point during his ill-advised jaunt lends a queasy suspense to the proceedings. It’s like watching a slow-motion car wreck".

Ratings 
The original broadcast was watched by 732,000 viewers.

References

External links 

 "Chalk One Up" at Showtime
 

2020 American television episodes
Homeland (season 8) episodes